The 1968 Pittsburgh riots were a series of urban disturbances that erupted in Pittsburgh on April 5, 1968, following the assassination of Martin Luther King. Pittsburgh, along with 110 other cities, burned for several days and 3,600 National Guardsmen were needed to quell the disorder. The neighborhoods most impacted were the Hill District, North Side, and Homewood, with casualties including one death and 36 injuries. Over 100 businesses were either vandalized or looted with arsonists setting 505 fires. After six days, order was finally restored on April 11, with property damage surpassing $600,000 (equivalent to $ in ) and 1,000 arrests being made by law enforcement. Many of the areas affected by the disorder would never fully recover in the following decades.

See also
 List of incidents of civil unrest in the United States

Other Civil Rights-Era riots in Pennsylvania
 1964 Philadelphia Riot
 1969 York Riot

References

King assassination riots
African-American riots in the United States
Riots and civil disorder in Pittsburgh
1960s in Pittsburgh
April 1968 events in the United States